James John "Chief" Roseman (July 4, 1856 – July 4, 1938) was an American Major League Baseball player from Brooklyn, New York. He played in the outfield for six teams, mainly in American Association, during his seven-season career. In  he was the player-manager over a short period for the St. Louis Browns.

Roseman died on his 82nd birthday in 1938 in Brooklyn, New York, and is interred at St. John Cemetery in Middle Village, New York.

See also
List of Major League Baseball player-managers

References

External links

1856 births
1938 deaths
19th-century baseball players
Major League Baseball player-managers
Major League Baseball outfielders
Troy Trojans players
New York Metropolitans players
Philadelphia Athletics (AA) players
Brooklyn Grays players
St. Louis Browns (AA) players
Louisville Colonels players
Brooklyn Chelsea players
Buffalo (minor league baseball) players
Auburn (minor league baseball) players
Springfield (minor league baseball) players
New Bedford (minor league baseball) players
Holyoke (minor league baseball) players
Brooklyn Atlantics (minor league) players
New York Metropolitans (minor league) players
Albany Governors players
St. Louis Browns (AA) managers
Baseball players from New York (state)
Sportspeople from Brooklyn
Baseball players from New York City
Burials at St. John's Cemetery (Queens)